Believe  is a 2007 mockumentary/comedy about the world of multi-level marketing (MLM). This is the first movie by director Loki Mulholland, who is also credited for the screenplay.

Believe was produced by Russ Kendall and Micah Merrill of Kaleidoscope Pictures.

Plot

Set in the town of Springfield, Believe tells the story of Adam Pendon (Larry Bagby), a struggling truck driver who was recently laid off from his job at the steel mill when it closed.  Adam is approached by a salesman for a multi-level marketing company, Believe Industries.  The salesman, Mark Fuller (Lincoln Hoppe), offers Adam a business opportunity.

Adam agrees to meet Mark at a local hotel for the business meeting.  This meeting is filled with distributors for Believe Industries, such as Dan Bretenheirmer (Steve Anderson) and Sally Bretenheirmer (Ann Bosler) who are unable to succeed at Believe, even though they sincerely try to work the program.  Tom (Brian Neal Clark) and Amy Hawks (Britani Bateman) are a focused couple who also meet Adam.

The owner of Believe is Howard Flash (Jeff Olson), who claims to have lived in a trailer park until the business of Believe saved his life and made him wealthy.

Adam decides to join Believe and succeeds unexpectedly.  He is invited to be a speaker at a Believe convention.  The crux of the plot is Adam at a crossroads of either enjoying wealth and fame from Believe or walking away because he believes he is misleading other people with his wealth and fame.

Cast

 Larry Bagby : Adam Pendon
 Lincoln Hoppe : Mark Fuller
 Vanessa DeHart : Jean Pendon
 Brian Clark : Tom Hawks
 Britani Bateman : Amy Hawks
 Steve Anderson : Dan Bretenheimer
 Ann Bosler :  Sally Bretenheimer
 Jeff Olson : Howard Flash
 Craig Clyde : Mitch Harris
 Jodi Russell : Betty Fuller
 J. Scott Bronson : Dr. Bronson
 Curt Dousett : John Miller
 K. Danor Gerald : Ray Sterago
 Leilani Marshall : Lola
 Dutch Whitlock : Chris Bretenheimer
 Graham Russell : John Loch
 Morgan Lund : Reverend Goldsmith
 Jimmy Chunga : Himself

Background 
For four years, Mulholland was a distributor for Amway, one of the most well-known MLM companies in the world.

See also
List of ghost films

References

External links 
 

2007 films
American mockumentary films
Films about music and musicians
2007 independent films
American independent films
American satirical films
2000s mockumentary films
2007 comedy films
2000s English-language films
2000s American films